The Canadian Folk Music Award for English Songwriter of the Year is a Canadian award, presented as part of the Canadian Folk Music Awards to honour the year's best songwriting in Canadian folk music. Unlike many songwriting awards, the nomination is given in consideration of all of the songwriting on a whole album rather than singling out individual songs. Awards are also presented for French Songwriter of the Year and Indigenous Songwriter of the Year.

2000s

2010s

2020s

References

English Songwriter
Songwriting awards